Malise (Gaelic: Maol Íosa; fl. 1099–1141) is the earliest-known earl, or mormaer, of Strathearn in central Scotland.

In 1138, Malise participated in King David's invasion of England, and he fought in the vanguard at the Battle of the Standard. Like his son and successor Ferquhard, Malise is largely absent from the witness lists of Scottish royal charters, indicating a lack of involvement in royal government. He was, however, a witness to a charter of David, confirming certain gifts and grants to Dunfermline Abbey, dated about 1128.

Aelred of Rievaulx portrays Malise as the chief representative of the native Scottish faction at the royal court, opposed to the faction of Normans led by Robert de Brus.

He married Rosabella Forteith, by whom he had his son Ferquhard, his only known issue.

Bibliography
 Neville, Cynthia J., Native Lordship in Medieval Scotland: The Earldoms of Strathearn and Lennox, c. 1140-1365 (Portland & Dublin, 2005)

References

12th-century deaths
People from Perth and Kinross
12th-century mormaers
Year of birth unknown
Place of birth unknown
Year of death unknown
Place of death unknown
Mormaers of Strathearn